The Tennessee Tennis Hall of Fame is an organization created in 1992 under the authority of the United States Tennis Association (USTA) which is the national governing body for tennis in the United States. Tennessee is one of the nine states in the USTA's Southern Division, functioning as the "Tennessee Tennis Patrons Foundation" established in 1988. The latter is a non-profit 501(c)(3) corporation governed by an eight-member volunteer board which is responsible for choosing the state's hall of fame inductees. As of 2022, it includes 82 honorees including five-time U.S. Davis Cup member Roscoe Tanner  and Great Britain Davis Cup team member Derrick Barton who moved to Tennessee to coach.

Tennessee Tennis Hall of Fame members
  
1992 — Lacy Roe Campbell
1992 — Eldon Roark
1992 — Pollard Parsons
1992 — Reese Patterson
1992 — Stanley Ford
1992 — Tommy Bartlett
1992 — Joe C. Davis Jr.
1992 — Alex Guerry
1993 — Jeanne Jenkins
1993 — Les Jenkins
1993 — Tommy Warren K. “Bopper” Clark
1993 — John P. "Jack" Murphy
1993 — Zan Guerry
1993 — Jane Crofford
1993 — Alexander Wellford Sr.
1993 — Elizabeth Virginia "Eaddy" Dameron
1994 — Joe Garcia Jr.
1994 — Roscoe Tanner
1994 — Nelle Molly
1996 — Tommy Buford
1996 — Frank Willett
1996 — John "Yo" Strang
1996 — Peter van Lingen
1996 — John Patton Guerry
1997 — Bonnie Dondeville-Farley
1999 — Howard Z. Blum
1999 — Derrick Barton
1999 — Brownlee Curry Jr.
1999 — Thay Butchee
2001 — Phil Chamberlain
2001 — Tommy Mozur
2001 — Marilyn Voges Brown
2001 — Bob Helton
2003 — Mike DePalmer Sr.
2003 — Bill Tym
2003 — DeWayne McCamish
2005 — John Beebe Nixon
2005 — Dave Mullins
2005 — Martha Anne Ferriss Parker
2005 — George McIntosh
2005 — W. R. “Rogers” McCall
2005 — Kay McDaniel 
2005 — Louise George|
2006 — Candy Reynolds
2007 — Stephen Lang Jr.
2007 — William A. “Billy” Pike
2007 — Anne Hutcheson Price
2007 — Wesley Cash
2007 — Peggy Winningham
2007 — G. Turner Howard III
2007 — Caroline Haynes
2008 — Sue T. Bartlett
2008 — Ben Testerman
2009 — Jenny Settle
2009 — Darrell McDonald
2009 — Allen Morgan Jr.
2010 — Susan Hill Whitson
2010 — Elizabeth Sharp Henderson
2011 — Dana Royal Forsyth
2011 — Kapner "Cappie" Clark Boles
2012 — Fran Chandler
2012 — Pat Guerry
2013 — William T. Mathes
2013 — Alice Luthy Tym
2015 — William Dunavant Jr.
2016 — Phyllis Taylor
2016 — Eric Voges
2017 — Ned Caswell
2017 — Chris Woodruff
2018 — Cindy Kemp Battle
2019 — Pem Guerry
2019 — Sue McCulloch Webb
2019 — Keith West
2019 — Mike Hurley
2020 — Carla Brangenberg
2020 — Chris Brown
2021 — John Kreis
 — Charlie Willis
 — Percy Green
 — Clyde McCambell
 — Jane Taylor
 — Nathan Thorpe

References

External links
 Tennessee Tennis Hall of Fame

Tennis organizations
Sports halls of fame